Chapman codes are a set of 3-letter codes used in genealogy to identify the administrative divisions in the United Kingdom, Ireland, the Isle of Man and the Channel Islands.

Use
They were created by the historian, Dr. Colin R Chapman, in the late 1970s, and as intended, provide a widely used shorthand in genealogy which follows the common practice of describing areas in terms of the counties existing in the 19th and 20th centuries.

Other uses
Chapman codes have no mapping, postal or administrative use.  They can however be useful for disambiguation by postal services where a full county name or traditional abbreviation is not supplied after a place name which has more than one occurrence, a particular problem where these are post towns such as Richmond.

Country codes

CHI Channel Islands
ENG England
IOM Isle of Man
IRL Ireland
NIR Northern Ireland
SCT Scotland
WLS Wales
ALL All countries

Channel Islands

ALD Alderney
GSY Guernsey
JSY Jersey
SRK Sark

England

Historic counties

BDF Bedfordshire
BRK Berkshire
BKM Buckinghamshire
CAM Cambridgeshire
CHS Cheshire
CON Cornwall
CUL Cumberland
DBY Derbyshire
DEV Devonshire
DOR Dorset
DUR Durham
ESS Essex
GLS Gloucestershire
HAM Hampshire
HEF Herefordshire
HRT Hertfordshire
HUN Huntingdonshire
KEN Kent
LAN Lancashire
LEI Leicestershire
LIN Lincolnshire
MDX Middlesex
NFK Norfolk
NTH Northamptonshire
NBL Northumberland
NTT Nottinghamshire
OXF Oxfordshire
RUT Rutland
SAL Shropshire (Salop)
SOM Somerset
STS Staffordshire
SFK Suffolk
SRY Surrey
SSX Sussex
WAR Warwickshire
WES Westmorland
WIL Wiltshire
WOR Worcestershire
YKS Yorkshire
ERY East Riding
NRY North Riding
WRY West Riding

Administrative areas

AVN Avon
CLV Cleveland
CMA Cumbria
SXE East Sussex
GTM Greater Manchester
HWR Hereford and Worcester
HUM Humberside
IOW Isle of Wight
LND London
MSY Merseyside
WMD West Midlands
NYK North Yorkshire
SYK South Yorkshire
TWR Tyne and Wear
SXW West Sussex
WYK West Yorkshire

Scotland

Historic counties

ABD Aberdeenshire
ANS Angus (formerly Forfarshire)
ARL Argyll (Argyllshire)
AYR Ayrshire
BAN Banffshire
BEW Berwickshire
BUT Bute (Buteshire)
CAI Caithness
CLK Clackmannanshire
DFS Dumfriesshire
DNB Dunbartonshire
ELN East Lothian (formerly Haddingtonshire)
FIF Fife
INV Inverness-shire
KCD Kincardineshire
KRS Kinross-shire
KKD Kirkcudbrightshire
LKS Lanarkshire
MLN Midlothian (formerly Edinburghshire)
MOR Moray (formerly Elginshire)
NAI Nairnshire
OKI Orkney
PEE Peeblesshire
PER Perthshire
RFW Renfrewshire
ROC Ross and Cromarty
ROX Roxburghshire
SEL Selkirkshire
SHI Shetland
STI Stirlingshire
SUT Sutherland
WLN West Lothian (formerly Linlithgowshire)
WIG Wigtownshire

1975–1996 regions

BOR Borders
CEN Central
DGY Dumfries and Galloway
FIF Fife
GMP Grampian
HLD Highland
LTN Lothian
OKI Orkney Isles
SHI Shetland Isles
STD Strathclyde
TAY Tayside
WIS Western Isles

Wales

Historic counties

AGY Anglesey
BRE Brecknockshire
CAE Caernarfonshire
CGN Cardiganshire
CMN Carmarthenshire
DEN Denbighshire
FLN Flintshire
GLA Glamorgan
MER Merionethshire
MON Monmouthshire
MGY Montgomeryshire
PEM Pembrokeshire
RAD Radnorshire

1974–1996

CWD Clwyd
DFD Dyfed
GNT Gwent
GWN Gwynedd
MGM Mid Glamorgan
POW Powys
SGM South Glamorgan
WGM West Glamorgan

Northern Ireland

ANT Antrim
ARM Armagh
DOW Down
FER Fermanagh
LDY Londonderry
TYR Tyrone

Ireland

CAR Carlow
CAV Cavan
CLA Clare
COR Cork
DON Donegal
DUB Dublin
GAL Galway
KER Kerry
KID Kildare
KIK Kilkenny
LET Leitrim
LEX Leix (formerly Queen's)
LIM Limerick
LOG Longford
LOU Louth
MAY Mayo
MEA Meath
MOG Monaghan
OFF Offaly (formerly King's)
ROS Roscommon
SLI Sligo
TIP Tipperary
WAT Waterford
WEM Westmeath
WEX Wexford
WIC Wicklow

See also

 Historic counties of England
 Historic counties of Scotland
 Historic counties of Wales
 Counties of Northern Ireland

References

 The Chapman County Code for British Isles Counties, Lochin Publishing, accessed 13 October 2019

Geocodes
British genealogy
Irish genealogy